Hut-e Amr (also Romanized as Hūt-e ʿAmr) is a village in Zaboli Rural District, in the Central District of Mehrestan County, Sistan and Baluchestan Province, Iran. At the 2006 census, its population was 119, in 22 families.

References 

Populated places in Mehrestan County